Here We Go Again is an American sitcom series starring LeToya Luckett and Wendy Raquel Robinson, that debuted on TV One on February 5, 2016. A sneak preview was aired after the 47th NAACP Image Awards on February 5, 2016.

Summary
Here We Go Again follows three generations of Walker women: Loretta (Wendy Raquel Robinson), who became a mother at the age of 16, and her daughter Maddy (LeToya Luckett) who also gave birth to her daughter Shante (Kyndall Ferguson) at age 16.

Cast
Wendy Raquel Robinson as Loretta
Andra Fuller as Victor
LeToya Luckett as Maddy Walker
Travis Winfrey as Cedric
Kyndall Ferguson as Shante Walker
Robert Crayton as Bartender

Episodes

References

External links
 
 

2010s American black sitcoms
2016 American television series debuts
2016 American television series endings
English-language television shows
Television series about dysfunctional families
Television shows filmed in Georgia (U.S. state)